Harold Warp (December 21, 1903 – April 8, 1994) was an American businessman who invented Flex-O-Glass. He also founded Pioneer Village in Minden, Nebraska. 

Harold Warp was born in a sod house on a farm near Minden, Nebraska. He was the youngest of twelve children born to an immigrant family from Norway. When he was three years old, his father died and his mother died when he was eleven. In 1924, he and two of his brothers moved to Chicago with a patent for a plastic window material he had developed. Their business became successful and in time its product line grew to include many other plastic products. Warp Bros. is still in business and remains under family ownership. Harold Warp was the recipient of numerous awards including the Horatio Alger Award in 1979 and the Distinguished Nebraskalander Award in 1984. 

Pioneer Village opened in 1953 in Minden, Nebraska.  In 1983, Warp donated the museum to the nonprofit Harold Warp Pioneer Village Foundation.

References

Further reading
Warp, Harold (2012) A History Of Man's Progress From 1830 To The Present (Literary Licensing, LLC)

External links
Warp Bros. website
Pioneer Village website

1903 births
1994 deaths
Businesspeople from Nebraska
American people of Norwegian descent
20th-century American businesspeople
People from Minden, Nebraska
20th-century American inventors